Watergate is the second album by American underground hip hop group Thirsty Fish. It was released on Mush Records on May 10, 2011. It is a follow up to the 2007 album Testing the Waters. The album is executive produced by Busdriver of Project Blowed.

Artwork
The cover art was done by Los Angeles artist DosTres, the same artist used on the group's first album Testing the Waters, group member Dumbfoundead's solo debut Super Bario Bros EP, and group member Open Mike Eagle's Unapolegetic Art Rap.

Track listing

References
0.   http://www.soundsprinkle.com/downloads/watergate-sounds-like-rap

External links
 Watergate on Mush Records

Albums produced by Exile (producer)
Thirsty Fish albums
2011 albums
Project Blowed